Group H of the 2023 Africa Cup of Nations qualification tournament is one of the twelve groups that will decide one of the 24 teams that shall qualify for the 2023 Africa Cup of Nations as Ivory Coast have already qualified as the hosts. This group consists of four teams: Hosts Ivory Coast, Zambia, Comoros and Lesotho.

The teams shall play against each other in a home-and-away round-robin format, between 3 June 2022 and March 2023.

Standings

Matches

Goalscorers

References

Group H